Network UPS Tools (NUT) is a suite of software component designed to monitor power devices, such as uninterruptible power supplies, power distribution units, solar controllers and servers power supply units. Many brands and models are supported and exposed via a network protocol and standardized interface.

It follows a three-tier model with dozens of NUT device driver daemons that communicate with power-related hardware devices over selected media using vendor-specific protocols, the NUT server  which represents the drivers on the network (defaulting to IANA registered port ) using the standardized NUT protocol, and NUT clients (running on same  as the server, or on remote systems) which can manage the power devices and query their power states and other metrics for any applications, usually ranging from historic graphing and graceful shutdowns to orchestrated power failover and VM migration.

Based on NUT design and protocol, the project community authored "UPS management protocol", Informational RFC 9271, which was published by IETF in August 2022, and the IANA port number registry was updated to reflect it (even though this RFC is not formally an Internet Standard).

Community projects include more clients and bindings for other languages.

Being a cross-platform project, NUT works on most Unix, BSD and Linux platforms with various system architectures, from embedded systems to venerable Solaris, HP-UX and AIX servers. There were also native Windows builds based on previous stable NUT release line, last being 2.6.5. This effort was revived after the NUT 2.8.0 release, becoming part of the main codebase in September 2022 (at this time there are areas of the codebase documented in the project as placeholders and not yet ported to the Windows platform, and packages are not yet produced by the project).

History
Pavel Korensky's original  provided the inspiration for pursuing the APC Smart-UPS protocol in 1996. This is the same software that Apcupsd derived from, according to the Debian maintainer of the latter.

Russell Kroll, the original NUT author and coordinator, released the initial package, named smartupstools, in 1998.

Evgeny "Jim" Klimov, the current project leader since 2020, focuses first on automated testing and quality assurance of existing codebase to ensure minimal breakage introduced by new contributions, as well as to clean up older technical debts and inconsistencies highlighted by modern lint and coverage tools, and issuing a long-overdue new official release.

Over its two-decade history, the open-source project became the de facto standard solution for UPS monitoring provided with OS distributions and embedded into many NAS solutions, some converged hypervisor set-ups, and other appliances, and enjoyed contributions and support from numerous end-users as well as representatives of power hardware vendors providing protocol specifications, sample hardware, and in many cases new NUT driver code and subsequent fixes based on NUT community feedback.

References

External links

 

Electrical device control software
Free software programmed in C
Servers (computing)
Linux software
Uninterruptible power supply
Unix software